Sonia Mbele is a South African actress, model, tv producer and entrepreneur. She produced the first ever Real Housewives franchise in Africa, and is the executive producer for Real Housewives of Johannesburg.

Early life
Sonia Mbele was born in December 1976 in Natalspruit, South Africa.

Career
Mbele began her career in 1998 as a lead act in an SABC 2 drama production that was called Phamokate and in 1999 she was awarded at the FNB Vita Award for Most Promising New Actress. In 2003, Mbele was cast in SABC 1 soap series Generations through which she rose to prominence in South Africa, she played her role as Ntombi Khumalo up to 2011. In 2009, Mbele won the Golden Horn Award for Best Actress in a TV Soap at the South African Film and Television Awards.

Mbele became the first black celebrity to be named face of Dark & Lovely, Lux, and Sun-Silk in South Africa.

In 2018, Mbele brought the first The Real Housewives franchise to Africa which premiered in South Africa as Real Housewives of Johannesburg through her company Sonia Mbele Films, then in 2021, she created another reality tv series called Pastor’s Wives for HONEY TV.

Filmography

Television

External links

References

Living people
South African actresses
1976 births